The 1974 Huntsville Prison siege was an eleven-day prison uprising that took place from July 24 to August 3, 1974, at the Huntsville Walls Unit of the Texas Department of Corrections in Huntsville, Texas. The standoff was one of the longest hostage-taking sieges in United States history.

Siege 
From July 24 to August 3, 1974, Federico "Fred" Gomez Carrasco and two other inmates laid siege to the education/library building of the Walls Unit.  "Fred" Carrasco, the most powerful heroin kingpin in South Texas, was serving a life sentence for the attempted murder of a police officer. He was also suspected in the murder of dozens of people in Mexico and Texas.  Having smuggled pistols and ammunition into the prison, he and two other convicts took eleven prison workers and four inmates hostage.

At the precise moment that a one o'clock work bell sounded, Carrasco walked up a ramp to the third-story library and forced several prisoners out at gunpoint. When two guards tried to go up the ramp, Carrasco fired at them.  His two accomplices, who were also armed, immediately joined him in the library.
The prison warden and the director of the Texas Department of Corrections immediately began negotiations with the convicts. FBI agents and Texas Rangers arrived to assist them, as the media descended on Huntsville.  Over the next several days the convicts made a number of demands, such as tailored suits, dress shoes, toothpaste, cologne, walkie-talkies and bulletproof helmets, all of which were provided promptly.  With the approval of Texas Governor Dolph Briscoe, an armored getaway car was rolled into the prison courtyard. Carrasco claimed that they were planning to flee to Cuba and appeal to Fidel Castro.

After a grueling eleven-day standoff, the convicts finally made their desperate escape attempt just before 10 PM on Saturday August 3, 1974.  They moved out of the library toward the waiting vehicle in a makeshift shield consisting of legal books taped to mobile blackboards that was later dubbed by the press the "Trojan Taco".  Inside the shield were the three convicts and four hostages, while eight other hostages ringed the exterior of the "taco".

Acting on a prearranged plan, prison guards and Texas Rangers blasted the group with fire hoses.  However, a rupture in the hose gave the convicts time to fatally shoot the two women hostages who had volunteered to join the convicts in the armored car.  When prison officials returned fire, Carrasco committed suicide and one of his two accomplices, Rodolpho Dominguez, was killed. Syndicated columnist Cal Thomas, who was an onsite reporter for Houston's KPRC-TV at the time, later wrote, "It is a tragedy that two hostages died. It is a miracle all the rest lived."

The two female hostages who were killed during the incident were Yvonne Beseda and Julia Standley.

Aftermath 

Ignacio Cuevas (July 31, 1931 – May 23, 1991), the surviving perpetrator, received the Texas Department of Corrections Death Row ID #526. Cuevas was received as a death row prisoner on May 30, 1975. Cuevas was held at the Ellis Unit, and he was executed on May 23, 1991. Cuevas's last meal request consisted of chicken dumplings, steamed rice, sliced bread, black-eyed peas, and iced tea. Cuevas's last words were "I'm going to a beautiful place. O.K., warden, roll 'em."

Cultural references 
Tex-Mex musician Joe "King" Carrasco (born Joe Teusch) adopted the drug king's surname.

"When I was playing with the Mexican bands, they couldn't say Teusch," he says. "That was when Fred Carrasco had tried to break out of Huntsville back in 1974 with a big shootout. Carrasco was killed, so that week the Mexican guys said, "We're going to call you Carrasco."

Los Socios de San Antonio have a tribute song entitled "La Muerte de Fred Gomez Carrasco".

The Riot and the "Trojan Taco" was also mentioned in the episode "The Reverse Midas Touch" during the 5th season of Orange is the New Black, in a news segment in which a historian unfolds several prison riots and the fatal consequence prisoners typically face afterwards.

See also
 Capital punishment in Texas
 Capital punishment in the United States
 List of people executed in Texas, 1990–1999

References

External links

 "Texas Department of Criminal Justice: An Inventory of the Carrasco Tapes at the Texas State Archives, 1974." University of Texas Libraries.

1974 crimes in the United States
1974 riots
Hostage taking in the United States
Huntsville, Texas
Prison uprisings in the United States
Riots and civil disorder in Texas
1974 in Texas